MV (RMS) Mona's Queen (V) Official No. 307621 was a car-ferry built in 1971–72 for the Isle of Man Steam Packet Company. From 1972 to 1990, she operated to and from Douglas, Isle of Man. After a lengthy lay-up, she was sold in 1995, renamed Mary the Queen and operated as a ferry in south-east Asia, mainly sailing between Manila and Boracay. She was sold to Indian shipbreakers and beached in 2008.

Construction and design 

Mona's Queen was built by Ailsa Shipbuilding Company at Troon, Scotland, the third of four car ferries constructed for the Isle of Man Steam Packet Company. Mona's Queen was the first diesel engined passenger ferry in the fleet.

Slightly heavier than her two predecessors, Mona's Queen had accommodation for 1600 passengers, 55 crew, and approximately 100 vehicles. Vehicles were loaded through side doors positioned at various levels on either side of the ship.

Mona's Queen was powered by two 10-cylinder P.C.2 Crossley Pielstick engines, producing 10,000 brake horsepower. Propulsion was by variable-pitch propellers – the first time these had been used in the Isle of Man fleet. These meant she could be controlled from the bridge or engine room, with all engine conditions monitored from a control room within the main engine room.

Service history 
Launched at Troon during Christmas week 1971, Monas Queen made her maiden voyage from Liverpool to Douglas on 9 June 1972, just missing the peak traffic of TT week.

Mona's Queen gave reliable service to the Isle of Man from 1972 until 1985. She has two inaugural voyages to her credit, making the first car ferry trip from Douglas to Dublin in 1974, 133 years on from the first passenger service between the two ports, and in June 1976, Mona's Queen completed the first car ferry sailing from Fleetwood with 34 cars aboard.

After the merger between the Steam Packet Co. and the Manx Line in 1985, Mona's Queen  was used mainly during the holiday season or chartered out. In September 1989, she was chartered by Sealink for the services from Portsmouth and Weymouth to Cherbourg. She was withdrawn from service on 3 September 1990 and laid up at the Vittoria Dock, Birkenhead.

In December 1995, after a lengthy lay-up, she was sold to MBRS Lines (Manila-Banton-Romblon-San Agustin Shipping Lines) and renamed Mary the Queen. She sailed from Liverpool to the Philippines, covering 9,700 miles in 37 days. In Manila, she underwent an internal rebuild, converting her to a night ferry. Externally, the boat deck and bridge wings were covered, and several lifeboats removed. After the conversion, she operated mainly between Manila and Boracay.

On 9 February 2004 on a voyage from San Augustin to Manila she caught fire off Sibuyan Island; the fire was extinguished within an hour.

Mary the Queen was sold to Indian ship-breakers and beached at Alang on 1 September 2008.

In 2011, MBRS lines put an ex-Canary Islands cruise ship formerly named City of Valencia into service as Mary the Queen, servicing routes formerly serviced by her namesake.

Gallery

Footnotes

External links

1971 ships
Ships built in Scotland
Ships of the Isle of Man Steam Packet Company
Ferries of the Isle of Man
Merchant ships of the United Kingdom
Ferries of the Philippines